Monument of Sailor is a monument in Szczecin, Poland at the Grunwald Square at the John Paul II Avenue. It was designed by Ryszard Chachulski and completed on 19 June 1980.

Description 

The monument has a form of statue of the helmsman sailor standing behind ship's wheel. It is made out of copper plate and stands on the concrete plinth veneered with gray granite plates. The height of the statue is 385 cm (12.6 ft) and total height of the monument is 495 cm (16.3 ft).

Christmas season 
Every year since 2017, on 1 December, the monument is dressed up in the costume of Santa Claus, with given the mantle, trousers, hat and beard. The event is organised by Polsteam as part of a promotional campaign of the local Christmas market that takes place on Kwiatowa Avenue, and at Żołnierza Polskiego and Lotników Squares.

It takes 1.5 hours to dress up the statue. The costume was made by team of three people, including Ewelina Szubartowska, and required around 25 metres of the material, three metres of sheepskin coat and 10 metres of zipper.

Explanatory notes

Citations

General bibliography 
 Encyklopedia Szczecina, vol. 2, Szczecin, 2000, .

1980 establishments in Poland
1980 sculptures
Buildings and structures in Szczecin
Christmas art
Marine art
Monuments and memorials in Poland
Monuments and memorials in Szczecin
Outdoor sculptures in Poland
Santa Claus
Sculptures of men
Statues in Poland